FBI is an American crime drama television series created by Dick Wolf and Craig Turk that airs on CBS, where it premiered on September 25, 2018. The series is produced by Wolf Entertainment, CBS Studios, and Universal Television, with Dick Wolf, Arthur W. Forney, Peter Jankowski, and Turk serving as executive producers.

The series features an ensemble cast including Missy Peregrym, Zeeko Zaki, Jeremy Sisto, Ebonée Noel, Sela Ward, Alana de la Garza, John Boyd and Katherine Renee Turner. FBI received a straight-to-series commission for 13 episodes on September 20, 2017. In May 2020, CBS renewed the series for a third season. The third season premiered on November 17, 2020. In March 2021, CBS renewed the series for a fourth season, which premiered on September 21, 2021. In May 2022, CBS renewed the series for a fifth and sixth season.  The fifth season premiered on September 20, 2022.

Premise 
The series centers on inner workings of the New York City field office criminal division of the Federal Bureau of Investigation (FBI). This elite unit brings to bear all their talents, intellect, and technical expertise on major cases in order to keep New York and the country safe. Born into a multi-generational law enforcement family, Special Agent Maggie Bell commits deeply to the people she works with as well as those she protects. Her partner is Special Agent Omar Adom "O.A." Zidan, a West Point graduate from Queens who spent two years undercover for the DEA before being cherry-picked by the FBI. Overseeing them is Special Agent-in-Charge Dana Mosier, who operates under intense pressure and has undeniable command authority. The team also includes Assistant Special Agent in Charge Jubal Valentine, the nerve center of the office whose ability to easily relate to and engage with both superiors and subordinates makes him a master motivator. Kristen Chazal is the team's most valued resource, a brilliant analyst recruited straight out of college who can piece together the big picture faster than anyone. These first-class agents tenaciously investigate cases including terrorism, organized crime, and counterintelligence.

Starting in season 2, Stuart Scola, a former Wall Street trader-turned-Special Agent joins the team and is partnered with Kristen, who transitions into field work at the same time. Also, Isobel Castille takes Mosier's place as team supervisor following the latter's retirement. At the start of season 3, Kristen transfers to Dallas, Texas, and is replaced by Tiffany Wallace, a former New York Police Department officer and White Collar Division Special Agent.

Cast

Main
 Missy Peregrym as Maggie Bell, FBI Special Agent. She is the de facto agent in charge of the team while out in the field.
 Zeeko Zaki as Omar Adom "O.A." Zidan, FBI Special Agent and Maggie's partner, West Point graduate, and a retired Army Ranger Captain. 
 Jeremy Sisto as Jubal Valentine, FBI Assistant Special Agent-In-Charge (ASAC).
 Ebonée Noel as Kristen Chazal (seasons 1–2), FBI Special Agent and an Intelligence Analyst.
 Sela Ward as Special Agent-in-Charge (SAC) Dana Mosier (season 1), Solberg's replacement as the team's supervisor.
 Alana de la Garza as Special Agent-in-Charge (SAC) Isobel Castille (season 2 – present; guest season 1), Mosier's replacement as the team's supervisor.
 John Boyd as Stuart Scola (season 2 – present), FBI Special Agent and Kristen's, and later, Tiffany's field partner.
 Katherine Renee Turner as Tiffany "Tiff" Wallace (season 3 – present), FBI Special Agent and a former NYPD officer and White Collar Division agent. She is Kristen's replacement.

Recurring
 Derek Hedlund as Special Agent JT (seasons 1–2), an FBI Special Agent who frequently worked in the field with OA and Maggie.
 James Chen as Ian Lim, an FBI Technical Analyst.
 Thomas Phillip O'Neil as Dr. Neil Mosbach, an FBI Medical Examiner.
 Rodney Richardson as Ray Stapleton (season 1), an FBI Forensic Technician.
 Nina Lisandrello as Eve Nettles (season 1), an FBI Forensic Technician.
 Taylor Anthony Miller as Kelly Moran (season 2–present), an FBI Analyst.
 Roshawn Franklin as Trevor Hobbs (season 2–present), an FBI Special Agent and an Intelligence Analyst.
 Vedette Lim as Elise Taylor (season 2–present), an FBI intelligence analyst.
 Catherine Haena Kim as Emily Ryder (season 2), an FBI Special Agent who temporarily fills in for Kristen when she is injured in the line of duty.
 Josh Segarra as Nestor Vertiz (season 3), an FBI Supervisory Special Agent who worked on an undercover operation with Maggie and dated her before she ended their relationship in the FBI Season 3 episode, "Uncovered". He is also in charge of the Gang Unit.
 David Zayas as Antonio Vargas (seasons 3–4), the most notorious drug lord in the world and leader of the Durango Cartel.
 Kathleen Munroe as Rina Trenholm (seasons 3–4), FBI's Assistant Director in charge of the New York Field Office. After the events of the FBI Season 3 finale episode, "Straight Flush", she becomes the new FBI Assistant Director and also enters into a relationship with FBI Assistant Special Agent in Charge Jubal Valentine. She is shot and left wounded during the FBI Season 4 episode, "Unfinished Business" and even though she survives, she suffers a brain haemorrhage which occurred during a surgery. It's soon revealed that the attack on her was carried out on the orders of drug lord, Antonio Vargas who is seeking revenge against the FBI for the deaths of his wife and young son. Rina later dies off-screen a day prior to the FBI Season 4 episode, "Grief" due to her parents who also had the power of medical attorney over her opting to have her life support switched off with Jubal being left devastated by her death.
 Piter Marek as Rashid Bashir (season 4), FBI Special Agent In Charge of Counterterrorism. 
 Shantel VanSanten as Nina Chase (season 4–5), an FBI Special Agent who temporarily fills in for Maggie after she is exposed to sarin gas in the line of duty. She is also an undercover agent and as of FBI Season 5, is in a relationship with fellow FBI agent Stuart Scola.

Special guest stars
 Connie Nielsen as Special Agent-in-Charge (SAC) Ellen Solberg ("Pilot"), the team's initial supervisor.
 Billy Burke as Rowan Quinn, an FBI Supervisory Special Agent and undercover trainer who trained OA on undercover assignments. He was also FBI Special Agent Maggie Bell's UC instructor during her time at Quantico.
 R. Ward Duffy as John Van Leer, FBI Deputy Director.

Crossover characters
 Julian McMahon as Jess LaCroix, FBI Supervisory Special Agent (SSA) and Team leader of the Fugitive Task Force (FBI: Most Wanted). Has a history with FBI Assistant Special Agent-in-Charge Jubal Valentine, the two having previously worked together in the past.
 Keisha Castle-Hughes as Hana Gibson, FBI Special Agent and Technical Analyst assigned to the Fugitive Task Force (FBI: Most Wanted).
 Kellan Lutz as Ken Crosby, FBI Special Agent in the Fugitive Task Force (FBI: Most Wanted).
 Roxy Sternberg as Sheryll Barnes, FBI Special Agent and second in command of the Fugitive Task Force (FBI: Most Wanted).
 Nathaniel Arcand as Clinton Skye (season 1), FBI Special Agent assigned to the Fugitive Task Force as well as Jess LaCroix's brother-in-law and the uncle of Tali, Jess's daughter (FBI: Most Wanted).
 YaYa Gosselin as Tali Lacroix, daughter of Jess LaCroix (FBI: Most Wanted).
 Tracy Spiridakos as Detective Hailey Upton (season 2), a member of the Intelligence Unit for the Chicago Police Department (Chicago P.D.) who temporarily joins the NY field office for an interagency training program. She is OA's partner while she is on the show due to Peregrym's maternity leave in season 2.
 Luke Kleintank as Scott Forrester, FBI Supervisory Special Agent who is head of the International Fly Team for the FBI (FBI: International).

Episodes

Production

Development
The origins of the series go back to the Television Critics Association summer 2016 press tour, where Wolf revealed plans for a crime drama series, placed in New York and set in the world of the FBI. Wolf's original plan was to introduce it on the NBC network as a planned spin-off to his New York crime drama Law & Order: Special Victims Unit, where it was intended to introduce an FBI agent character, but NBC ultimately did not go through with it and the idea was later put on hold for different reasons. It's Wolf's first drama series to launch on a network other than NBC in 15 years. CBS officially picked up the series on September 20, 2017. The series is produced by CBS Television Studios and Universal Television.

On January 25, 2019, during the TCA press tour, FBI was renewed for a second season, which is set to premiere on September 24, 2019. On May 7, 2019, following the renewal it was announced that Milena Govich joined as co-executive producer and director.

On March 12, 2020, Universal Television has suspended the production of the last three episodes of the second season following the COVID-19 pandemic. However, on May 6, 2020, CBS announced that it was renewed for a third season which premiered on November 17, 2020. On March 24, 2021, CBS announced that it was renewed the series for a fourth season, which premiered on September 21, 2021.

On May 9, 2022, CBS renewed the series for a fifth and sixth season. The fifth season premiered on September 20, 2022.

Broadcast
The show airs on Tuesday nights in Canada on Global.

The show airs on Thursday nights at 9pm on Sky Witness in the United Kingdom.

The show airs on Thursday nights at 9:45pm on AXN Asia in the Southeast Asia.

Casting
On March 1, 2018, Zeeko Zaki was cast as Omar Adom. A week later, Jeremy Sisto was cast as Jubal, including Ebonée Noel also cast as Kristin. Before the end of the month, Missy Peregrym had joined the cast as Maggie. The FBI Special Agent in Charge in the first episode ("Pilot") was Ellen Solberg, played by Connie Nielsen. On May 16, 2018, the day of scheduling the series for fall 2018, Nielsen was announced to have left the series for undisclosed reasons.

On July 13, 2018, Sela Ward was cast in the second episode as Dana Mosier who fulfills a similar role to Connie Nielsen who was in the first episode. During the season finale, it was indicated that Ward would be departing the series after the first season. On July 9, 2019, Alana de la Garza—who played Isobel Castille in a guest appearance in the first season—was promoted to the main cast for the second season; she also recurs on the spin-off series FBI: Most Wanted.

On August 6, 2019, John Boyd was cast as Special Agent Stuart Scola, Kristin's new partner in the field, in a recurring role with the option to be promoted to regular at a later date. Boyd was promoted to regular on October 7, 2019. On August 28, 2020, Katherine Renee Turner was cast as a series regular for the third season. On April 20, 2022, it was announced that Shantel VanSanten would return as Special Agent Nina Chase in a recurring role, while Peregrym went inactive for her maternity leave.

Release

Syndication 
Since January 23, 2023, FBI airs on Ion Television as picked up for reruns syndication.

Reception

Critical response
On the review aggregator website Rotten Tomatoes, the first season has an approval rating of 63% based on 24 reviews, with an average rating of 6.22 out of 10. The website's critical consensus reads, "Dick Wolf's new series sports a compelling cast and adrenaline-spiking spectacle, although some viewers may find this retread of the mega-producer's previous procedural formulas overly familiar." Metacritic, which uses a weighted average, assigned a score of 57 out of 100 based on 13 critics, indicating "mixed or average reviews".

Ratings

Spin-offs

On January 29, 2019, it was announced that CBS had commissioned a backdoor pilot with an attached series commitment for a potential spin-off series titled FBI: Most Wanted, with the episode to air in the latter part of the first season. The series will focus on the division of the FBI tasked with tracking and capturing the most notorious criminals on the FBI's Most Wanted list.
According to Dick Wolf, the spin-off is set to launch a series of interconnected shows similar to Wolf's Chicago and Law & Order franchises on NBC. Actors who have been cast were reported to be: Julian McMahon, Alana de la Garza, Kellan Lutz, Roxy Sternberg, and Nathaniel Arcand, as well as Keisha Castle-Hughes. On May 9, 2019, CBS announced that FBI: Most Wanted had been ordered to series. The series, created by Rene Balcer, premiered on January 7, 2020.

On February 18, 2021, it was reported that a third series of the FBI franchise with the working title FBI: International spin-off was in development. On March 24, 2021, CBS announced that the spin-off had been ordered to series. On July 8, 2021, it was reported that Luke Kleintank, Heida Reed and Vinessa Vidotto were set to casts in the spin-off.

Notes

References

External links

  on Wolf Entertainment
  on CBS
 
 

 
2010s American crime drama television series
2010s American police procedural television series
2018 American television series debuts
2020s American crime drama television series
2020s American police procedural television series
CBS original programming
English-language television shows
FBI (franchise)
Television series about the Federal Bureau of Investigation
Television series by CBS Studios
Television series by Universal Television
Television series by Wolf Films
Television series created by Dick Wolf
Television shows set in New York City
Television shows set in New York (state)
Television productions suspended due to the COVID-19 pandemic